In plasma physics, a burning plasma is one in which most of the heating comes from fusion reactions involving thermal plasma ions. The Sun and similar stars are a burning plasma, and in 2022 the National Ignition Facility achieved burning plasma.

The Sun 

In the Sun and other similar stars, those fusion reactions involve hydrogen ions. The high temperatures needed to sustain fusion reactions are maintained by a self-heating process in which energy from the fusion reaction heats the thermal plasma ions via particle collisions. A plasma enters what scientists call the burning plasma regime when the self-heating power exceeds any external heating.

The Sun is a burning plasma that has reached fusion ignition, meaning the Sun's plasma temperature is maintained solely by energy released from fusion. The Sun has been burning hydrogen for 4.5 billion years and is about halfway through its life cycle.

The National Ignition Facility 

It was announced in 2022 that a burning plasma had been achieved at the National Ignition Facility, a large laser-based inertial confinement fusion research device, located at the Lawrence Livermore National Laboratory in Livermore, California. The burning plasma created was sustained for approximately 100 trillionths of a second, and the process consumed more energy than it created by a factor of approximately ten. NIF achieved ignition on December 5, 2022, net energy release from a burning plasma fusion reaction.

Burning plasma at ITER 

Many new scientific challenges await scientists at the frontiers of burning plasma science including understanding and controlling a strongly coupled, self-organized plasma; management of heat and particles that reach plasma-facing surfaces; demonstration of fuel breeding technology; and the physics of energetic particles. The ITER tokamak will be the first magnetic confinement experiment to explore these burning plasma issues. Fusion scientists and engineers at ITER will investigate the physics, engineering, and technologies associated with self-heating plasma. These issues are all critical to ITER's broader goal of using self-heating plasma reactions to become the first fusion energy device that produces more power than it consumes, a massive step toward commercial fusion power production.

To reach fusion-relevant temperatures, the ITER tokamak will heat plasmas using three methods. Ohmic heating involves heat generated by resistance to the plasma current. Neutral particle beam injection involves heating the plasma by injecting high-energy particles into the tokamak. High-frequency electromagnetic radiation involves heating the plasma by transferring energy from electromagnetic radiation to particles in the plasma.

Symbolic implications 
While on earth burning plasmas do not experience runaway chain reactions, a controlled burning plasma is the fusion equivalent of a fission nuclear explosion. Thus the first burning plasma has been characterized as the equivalent of the Trinity Test, with enormous implications for fusion for energy (fusion power); fusion for peacebuilding, one of the main tasks of ITER; and the weaponization of fusion, mainly for electricity for directed-energy weapons.

References 

Plasma physics
Nuclear fusion
Astronomy